The 1890 Lake Forest Foresters football team represented the Lake Forest College during the 1890 college football season.  The team compiled a 5–3 record, shut out two opponents, and outscored their opponents by a total of 176 to 95.  After losing their first three games, the Foresters finished their season with a five game win streak and an upset victory over the Wisconsin Badgers.

Schedule

References

Lake Forest
Lake Forest Foresters football seasons
Lake Forest Foresters football